Sahitya Akademi Translation Prizes are given each year to writers for their outstanding translations work in the 24 languages, including Meitei language (officially known as Manipuri language), since 1989.

Recipients  
Following is the list of recipients of Sahitya Akademi translation prizes for their works written in Manipuri. The award, as of 2019, consisted of 50,000.

See also 

 List of Sahitya Akademi Award winners for Meitei
 List of Yuva Puraskar winners for Meitei
 List of epics in Meitei language
 Meitei literature
 Meitei Language Day

References

External links
 Akademi Translation Prizes For Manipuri Language

Literary awards by language
Meitei-language literary awards
Meitei language-related lists
Manipur-related lists
Meitei
Indian literary awards
Translations into Meitei